Attalus or Attalos may refer to:

People
Several members of the Attalid dynasty of Pergamon
Attalus I, ruled 241 BC–197 BC
Attalus II Philadelphus, ruled 160 BC–138 BC
Attalus III, ruled 138 BC–133 BC
Attalus, father of Philetaerus of founder of the Attalid dynasty of Pergamon
Attalus, father of Attalus I of Pergamon
Attalus (general) (390–336 BC), courtier and general of Philip II of Macedonia
Attalus (son of Andromenes) (fl. 330–317 BC), general of Alexander the Great and Perdiccas
Attalus of Rhodes (fl. 2nd century BC), astronomer, contemporary of Hipparchus
Attalus (Stoic) (fl. 25 AD), Stoic philosopher and teacher of Seneca
Priscus Attalus (fl. 409–416), Roman senator who was proclaimed emperor twice by the Visigoths
St Attalus, Sicilian saint and protomartyr, bishop of Catania

Organisms
Attalus, a genus of beetles in the family Melyridae
Alburnus attalus, a ray-finned fish of family Cyprinidae
Henricus attalus, a moth of family Tortricidae

Other uses
Attalus (band), an American rock band formed in 2010